Hellinsia fumiventris is a moth of the family Pterophoridae. It is found in Colombia, Ecuador, Mexico and Peru.

The wingspan is 19‑22 mm. The forewings are ochreous‑brown and the markings are brown. The hindwings are brown‑grey and the fringes are grey‑brown. Adults are on wing in February and from  September to November, at altitudes up to 2,850 meters.

The larvae feed on Parthenium hysterophorus.

References

Moths described in 1877
fumiventris
Pterophoridae of South America
Moths of Central America
Moths of South America